Rory MacLeod (born 3 February 2006) is a Scottish professional footballer who plays as a forward for Dundee United.

Club career
In December 2021, aged only 15, MacLeod signed his first professional deal with Dundee United. On 9 February 2022, he became Dundee United's youngest player ever at the age of 16 years and 6 days when he came on as a late substitute in a 2–0 win over Motherwell.

International career
In October 2021, MacLeod was called up the Scotland under-16 squad for their Victory Shield matches. He scored in victory over Wales U16. In February 2022, he received his first call-up to the Scotland under-17 squad.

References

External links

Living people
2006 births
Scottish footballers
Association football forwards
Scotland youth international footballers
Scottish Professional Football League players
Dundee United F.C. players